Luge at the 2018 Winter Olympics was held at the Alpensia Sliding Centre near Pyeongchang, South Korea. A total of four luge events were held, between 10 and 15 February 2018.

Qualification

A maximum of 110 athletes were allowed to compete at the Games. Countries were assigned quotas using the world rankings of results from 1 November 2017 to 31 December 2017.

Competition schedule
The following was the competition schedule for all four events.

All times are (UTC+9).

Medal summary

Medal table

Events

Participating nations
A total of 110 athletes from 24 nations (including the IOC's designation of Olympic Athletes from Russia) were scheduled to participate.

References

External links
Official Results Book – Luge

 
2018
Luge
Winter Olympics
Luge competitions in South Korea